Louis Gottschalk may refer to:

Louis Moreau Gottschalk (1829–1869), American composer
Louis F. Gottschalk (1864–1934), American composer (grand-nephew of Louis M.)
Louis A. Gottschalk, American psychiatrist
Louis R. Gottschalk, American historian